The Scotland national semi-professional football team was a football team that represented Scotland. The Scotland semi-professional team competed in the Four Nations Tournament and was organised by the Scottish Football Association (SFA). The team was disbanded in 2008, when the SFA board decided to stop providing the finance needed for the team to operate. At the time the team was disbanded, players in the three senior non-leagues, the East of Scotland Football League, Highland Football League and South of Scotland Football League, were eligible for selection.

History
The semi-pro team was first formed in the late 1970s. The first incarnation of the team was originally made of players from Scottish Football League clubs outside the Premier Division. The most recent incarnation of the team (1990s and 2000s) was made of players selected from the two of the three former senior non leagues in Scotland; the Highland League and the East of Scotland League. The third senior non league was the South of Scotland League, which had not had a select side for long time, hampering scouting and selection, which coupled with friction over travel issues effectively saw what few players of calibre they had excluded.

The semi-pro team regularly played friendlies against a Highland League Select. They also regularly played preparation games against Scottish Football League clubs prior to international tournaments in the 1980s. The team was disbanded by the Scottish FA in November 2008. The Scottish FA decided to withdraw funding for the semi-professional side in order to save money, more than £20,000 worth of funding was pulled.

Four Nations Tournament 
There was no officially sanctioned competition by either UEFA or FIFA for national teams at non-league level, but Scotland competed in the annual Four Nations Semi-Pro Tournament between 1979 and 2008. The competition was abandoned from 1988 to 2001, while no competition took place in 1986. The first eight editions of the tournament (1979–1987) saw Scotland compete against England Semi-Pro, Netherlands Amateurs and Italy Serie C U-21s. The later reinstatement of the competition saw the semi-pro teams of Scotland, England, Wales and Republic of Ireland compete from 2002 to 2008. The Gibraltar national team replaced Ireland in the last edition. Scotland last hosted the Four Nations Tournament in 2007, when matches were played in Dingwall, Inverness and Brora. Scotland withdrew from the competition after 2008.
	

1979 Third-Place
1980 Winners
1981 Third-Place
1982 Winners
1983 Runners-Up
1984 Fourth-Place
1985 Winners
1986 no competition
1987 Third-Place
1988-2001 no competition
2002 Fourth-Place
2003 Runners-Up
2004 Runners-Up
2005 Runners-Up
2006 Third-Place
2007 Third-Place
2008 Third-Place

Tournament Managers

Other matches

References

Semi-pro
European national semi-professional association football teams
1970s establishments in Scotland